This is a list of public squares, plazas, in Spain and other areas with Spanish heritage.

Europe:
 Plaza Mayor, Madrid
 Puerta del Sol, Madrid
 Plaza de Colón, Madrid
 Plaça Sant Jaume, Barcelona
 Plaça de Catalunya, Barcelona
 Plaza Mayor, Valladolid
 Plaza Mayor, Salamanca
 Plaza de España, Seville

Asia:
 Plaza de Armas, Intramuros, Manila
 Plaza Dilao, Paco, Manila
 Plaza Lacson, Santa Cruz, Manila
 Plaza Miranda, Quiapo, Manila
 Plaza Moriones, Tondo, Manila
 Plaza Rajah Sulayman, Malate, Manila
 Plaza de Roma, Intramuros, Manila
 Plaza San Lorenzo Ruiz, Binondo, Manila

The Americas:
 Plaza de Mayo, Buenos Aires
 Plaza de la República, Buenos Aires
 Plaza 25 de Mayo, Rosario
 Plaza Murillo, La Paz
 Zócalo (Plaza de la Constitución), Mexico City
 Macroplaza, Monterrey
 Plaza de la Paz, Guanajuato, Guanajuato
 Plaza Mayor, Lima
 Los Angeles Plaza
 Plaza de la Constitución, St. Augustine, Florida
 Santa Fe Plaza
 Albuquerque Plaza
 Ranchos de Taos Plaza
 Plaza Independencia, Montevideo
 Plaza de la Independencia, Quito
 Plaza de Bolívar, Bogotá
 Plaza Colón, Mayagüez

Plaza